The year 1651 in music involved some significant events.

Events 
none listed

Publications 
Giovanni Battista Granata – , a collection of guitar music, published in Bologna
Claudio Monteverdi –  (Ninth book of madrigals for five voices) (Venice: Alessandro Vincenti), published posthumously
Stefano Pasino – Motetti a 2. 3. 4. concertati..., Op. 6 (Venice: Francesco Magni for Gardano)
John Playford – The English Dancing Master

Classical music 
none listed

Opera 
Francesco Cavalli – premier of La Calisto, Venice (November 28) and L'Eritrea

Births 
February 25 – Johann Philipp Krieger, composer (died 1735)
April 15 – Domenico Gabrielli, cellist and composer (died 1690)
June – Johann Georg Ahle, organist and composer (died 1706)
July 22 – Ferdinand Tobias Richter, organist and composer (died 1711)
December 28 – Johann Krieger, organist and composer (died 1735)

Deaths 
January 17 – Johannes Hieronymus Kapsberger, lutenist (born c. 1580)
October 6 – Heinrich Albert (born 1604), German composer and poet
November 18 – Bonifatio Ceretti, alto castrato (intended Endimione in La Calisto)
December 17 – Ennemond Gaultier, French lutenist and composer (born c. 1575)
December 19 – Giovanni Faustini, librettist for Francesco Cavalli (born 1615)
probable – Martin Peerson, English composer, organist, and virginalist (born c. 1571)

 
17th century in music
Music by year